Truká  is an extinct and unattested, but presumed, language of Brazil. The ethnic population is about 1,300.

It was originally spoken in the Ilha da Assunção archipelago of the São Francisco River in Cabrobó, Pernambuco State.

References

Further reading
Batista, Mércia Rejane Rangel. De caboclos da Assunção à índios Truká: estudo sobre a emergência da identidade étnica Truká. Rio de Janeiro: UFRJ-Museu Nacional, 1992. 229 p. (M.A. thesis)
CIMI Nordeste. Truká: violência, impunidade e descaso. Recife: Cimi-NE, 1992. 35 p. (Série 500 Anos de Resistência)
Gerlic, Sebastián (ed.). Os índios na visão dos índios. Truká. Salvador: Thydêwá, 2003.
 Fabre, Alain (2005): "Truká" (Diccionario etnolingüístico y guía bibliográfica de los pueblos indígenas sudamericanos.)

Unattested languages of South America
Indigenous languages of Northeastern Brazil